HMS Magnificent was a 74-gun third rate ship of the line of the Royal Navy, launched on 30 August 1806 at Blackwall Yard, captained by Rear-Admiral William Lloyd Towns.

She was hulked in 1825, and eventually sold out of the service in 1843.

Notes

References

Lavery, Brian (2003) The Ship of the Line - Volume 1: The development of the battlefleet 1650–1850. Conway Maritime Press. .

Ships of the line of the Royal Navy
Repulse-class ships of the line
1806 ships